His Honour John Michael Kerruish QC (2 November 1948 – 14 July 2010) was a Manx lawyer, who was the First Deemster and Clerk of the Rolls on the Isle of Man.

Early life

Born on 2 November 1948 to John Daniel and Olive Mona Kerruish, he was educated at Douglas High School for Boys, and later went on to study at University of Leeds.

Career
He acted as Deputy Governor and as the Lieutenant Governor for a period of about a month in 2005. Formerly he was the Second Deemster and prior to that Attorney General and thus sat in the Legislative Council.

Deemster Kerruish Award
The Deemster Kerruish Award was created two days after Kerruish's death. This award is to be presented "to the young lawyer who has shown most endeavour and progress in the preceding year".

Personal life
Kerruish married Marianne (née Butt) in 1973. They remained together until his death in July 2010. They had 1 son and 1 daughter together.

Death
He died of cancer at Hospice Isle of Man on 14 July 2010 at the age of 61.

References

|-
 

1948 births
2010 deaths
Manx judges
Manx politicians
Deaths from cancer in the Isle of Man